Tristan Jackson (born March 5, 1986) is a former professional Canadian football defensive back, playing nine seasons in the league. He was signed as a street free agent by the Edmonton Eskimos in 2008 where he played for three seasons before being traded to the Saskatchewan Roughriders. He played college football for the Central Arkansas Bears.

In a 2012 game against the BC Lions, Jackson returned a missed field goal deep in his own end zone for a 129-yard touchdown.

References

External links
Ottawa Redblacks bio  
Saskatchewan Roughriders bio

1986 births
Living people
American players of Canadian football
Canadian football defensive backs
Central Arkansas Bears football players
Edmonton Elks players
People from Perry County, Mississippi
Ottawa Redblacks players
Saskatchewan Roughriders players